Where U Been? is a stand-up DVD by comedian Sinbad, released by Comedy Central. “Sinbad. Where U Been?” DVD was released by Comedy Central on February 23, 2010. Containing special features, deleted scenes and all completely uncensored and uncut.

In addition to stand-up, music is featured.  A R&B band, led by Greg Phillinganes, plays music at the beginning and end of the show.  Sinbad plays drums at the beginning of the show, and plays guitar and sings at the end.

References

2010 comedy films
American comedy films
Stand-up comedy concert films
Films directed by Chuck Vinson